Manado State University (UNIMA) is a public university in Tondano, North Sulawesi (Sulawesi Utara), on a hill in Tonsaru Tataaran Tondano, Minahasa Regency, North Sulawesi, Indonesia. It is currently led by Prof. Dr. Deitje A. Katuuk, M.Pd.

History
UNIMA derived from the Higher Education Teacher Education (abbreviated PTPG in Bahasa Indonesian); one of four PTPG first established in Indonesia: PTPG Batusangkar, PTPG Malang, Bandung PTPG, PTPG Tondano; based on the Decree of the Minister of Education and Culture.

PTPG Tondano underwent several changes: at first the Guidance and Counseling University of Hasanuddin Makassar, then turned into FKIP Unhas Tondano in Manado, FKIP Sulteng (Sulawesi Tengah), IKIP Branch Yogyakarta at Manado, and the latter being a stand-alone IKIP based PTIP Decree No. 38 dated .

On 13 September 2000, IKIP converted to Manado State University, and was inaugurated by the Minister of National Education Republic of Indonesia Yahya Muhaimin on 14 October 2000.

Faculty
The university has nine faculties:
Diploma and Undergraduate programmes
Faculty of Engineering (FT) https://ft.UNIMA.ac.id
Faculty of Mathematics and Natural Sciences (FMIPA) https://fmipa.UNIMA.ac.id
Faculty of Social Sciences and Law (FIS) https://fis.UNIMA.ac.id
Faculty of Languages and Art (FBS) https://fbs.UNIMA.ac.id
Faculty of Economics and Business (FE) https://fe.UNIMA.ac.id
Faculty of Education and Psychology (FIP) https://fip.UNIMA.ac.id
Faculty of Sport Science (FIK) https://fik.UNIMA.ac.id
Graduate programme
UNIMA Postgraduate
Professional programme
Teacher Professional Education Programme

References

External links
 University website

Universities in North Sulawesi
Indonesian state universities